Deborah Grover is a Canadian actress, best known for her regular roles as prosecuting attorney Elaine Jeffers in Night Heat and Nora in Jann.

She is a two-time Canadian Screen Award nominee for Guest Performance in a Drama Series, including her role as Josephine Barry in Anne with an E, and her performance as Donna in Mary Kills People.

Her other roles have included the films Agnes of God, The Gate, The Christmas Wife, Under the Piano, When Innocence Is Lost, Rated X, The Uncles, The Shipping News, Where the Truth Lies, Six Figures, Fatman and Alice, Darling, and the television series Our Hero, Happy Town, How to Be Indie, Sensitive Skin and From.

References

External links

20th-century Canadian actresses
21st-century Canadian actresses
Canadian film actresses
Canadian stage actresses
Canadian television actresses
Living people
Year of birth missing (living people)